Charles Wells (December 30, 1786 – June 3, 1866) was an American politician, who served in both branches of the Massachusetts legislature, as a member of Boston's Common Council in 1822, on the Board of Aldermen from 1829 to 1830 and as the fourth mayor of Boston, Massachusetts from 1832 to 1833.

Early life
Wells was born to Thomas and Elizabeth (White) Wells
in Boston on December 30, 1786.

Marriage and family
Wells married Nancy Gardner of Boston, the couple had two sons and three daughters.

Mayoralty
Wells was mayor  for two terms from 1832 to 1834.  During his tenure as Mayor the Suffolk County court house was erected.  Blackstone Street was laid out and Broad and Commercial Streets were extended.

Massachusetts Charitable Mechanics Association
Wells was also the President of the Massachusetts Charitable Mechanic Association.

See also

 Timeline of Boston, 1820s-1830s

References

External links
Charles Wells from CelebrateBoston.com

Mayors of Boston
Massachusetts city council members
Massachusetts state senators
Members of the Massachusetts House of Representatives
1786 births
1866 deaths
19th-century American politicians